Dominic Joselito Tabuna (born 9 August 1980) is a Nauruan politician.

Earlier political career

Tabuna was elected to parliament in the 2004 general elections, gaining the seat of Pres Ekwona.

He has been subsequently re-elected in 2007 and 2008. Tabuna was defeated for re-election in 2013.

Speaker of Parliament

He served as the Deputy Speaker of the Parliament of Nauru and represented the Yaren Constituency in the Parliament of Nauru, and was Speaker of the Parliament of Nauru from 1 to 4 June 2010.

See also
 Politics of Nauru
 Elections in Nauru
 2008 Nauruan parliamentary election

References

Speakers of the Parliament of Nauru
Members of the Parliament of Nauru
1980 births
Living people
People from Yaren District
21st-century Nauruan politicians